Old Coulsdon is a village near Coulsdon in the London Borough of Croydon, England,  south of Charing Cross. It is the southernmost settlement in all of London.

Schools
Coulsdon Sixth Form College
Oasis Academy Coulsdon (Formerly Coulsdon High School)
Keston Junior, Primary and Infants
Byron Primary School
Coulsdon C of E Primary School

Oasis Academy Coulsdon was formerly Coulsdon High School. Before this it was Taunton Manor School.
Coulsdon College was formerly Purley College and that was formed from Purley High School for Boys and Purley High School for Girls.

Transport 
There are four regular London bus services in the area: 60, 466, 404, and route N68 which provides a link into Central London every 30 minutes during the night.

The closest train station is Coulsdon South, 0.9 miles away.

Churches
Old Coulsdon has one Church of England church, St John's the Evangelist. It is also home to St. Mary's Roman Catholic Church and Old Coulsdon Congregational Church.

Politics

Old Coulsdon is in the Parliamentary constituency of Croydon South where the current MP as of May 2015 has been Chris Philp of the Conservative Party. He was re-elected with 33,334 votes at the 2017 General Election.

At a local level, Old Coulsdon has three Conservative councilors on Croydon Borough Council.

References

External links 
Coulsdon & Old Coulsdon website

Areas of London
Districts of the London Borough of Croydon